Castletown is a north-eastern suburb of Esperance, a town in south-eastern Western Australia. Its local government area is the Shire of Esperance.

The suburb was gazetted in 1965.

Geography
It is bounded on the west by Norseman Road, on the north by Stable and Fisheries Roads, and on the east by Goldfields and Ormonde Roads.

Demographics

Castletown residents had a median age of 34, and the median individual income was $480 per week compared with $454 per week in the Esperance region. The population of Castletown was predominantly Australian-born - 83.5% as at the 2006 census and at the 2006 census, 3.9% of residents identified as Indigenous Australians.

References

Suburbs of Esperance, Western Australia